Maxime Guy Alfred Larroque (born 20 February 1989) is a French former footballer who is last known to have played as a defender or midfielder for Nikos & Sokratis Erimis.

Career

At the age of 17, Larroque trained with Olympiacos, Greece's most successful club.

In 2008, he was sent on loan to Anagennisi Arta in the Greek lower leagues from Greek top flight side OFI.

In 2009, he signed for AEL in the Cypriot top flight.

In 2014, Larroque signed for Cypriot lower league team Nikos & Sokratis Erimis from Colomiers in the French third division.

References

External links
 Maxime Larroque at playmakerstats.com

French footballers
Living people
Association football midfielders
Association football defenders
Expatriate footballers in Greece
French expatriate sportspeople in Greece
French expatriate sportspeople in Cyprus
1989 births
Footballers from Toulouse
Cypriot First Division players
Championnat National players
US Colomiers Football players
AEL Limassol players
French expatriate footballers
Expatriate footballers in Cyprus